Ellery Frederick Williams (March 20, 1926 – March 7, 2017) was an American football end who played for the New York Giants. He played college football at Santa Clara University, having previously attended Pasadena High School in Pasadena, California. He was a member of the Santa Clara University Hall of Fame. Williams died in 2017 at the age of 90.

References

2017 deaths
1926 births
American football ends
Santa Clara Broncos football players
New York Giants players
Players of American football from St. Louis
Pasadena High School (California) alumni